"Ännu doftar kärlek" ("There's Still a Scent of Love") is a song by Swedish singer-songwriter Marie Fredriksson, issued on 15 May 1984. Fredriksson had previously been lead vocalist for two commercially unsuccessful rock bands, Strul (Trivial) and MaMas Barn (MaMas Children). Following the disbandment of the latter group, she signed a recording contract as a solo artist with EMI Svenska, who released "Ännu doftar kärlek" as the lead single from her debut studio album, Het vind (1984).

The track was written by Fredriksson, the sole credited lyricist, and its music was composed by Fredriksson alongside record producer Lars-Göran "Lasse" Lindbom; he had previously produced several albums by pop rock band Gyllene Tider, whose lead vocalist, Per Gessle, co-wrote the b-side for "Ännu doftar kärlek"—"Tag detta hjärta" ("Take This Heart"). In 1986, Fredriksson and Gessle formed pop duo Roxette, who would go on to sell over 75 million records worldwide.

The song became a minor hit in her home country upon release, peaking at number eighteen on Sverigetopplistan and spending a sole week on the chart. Despite this limited commercial success, the track went on to attain enduring popularity in Sweden; it is regularly played at both weddings and funerals. On 8 June 2013, Fredriksson performed the song live in the Royal Chapel of Stockholm, during the wedding ceremony of Princess Madeleine of Sweden and Christopher O'Neill.

Track listing
Track 1 written by Marie Fredriksson and Lasse Lindbom; track 2 written by Per Gessle and Lindbom.
 7" single 
 "Ännu doftar kärlek" – 3:48
 "Tag detta hjärta" – 4:08

Credits and personnel
Credits adapted from the liner notes of the original vinyl single.

Musicians
 Marie Fredriksson – lead and background vocals, synthesizer solo
 Per "Pelle" Andersson – drums
 "Backa" Hans Eriksson – bass guitar
 Jan "Nane" Kvillsäter – electric guitar
 Lars-Göran "Lasse" Lindbom – acoustic guitar, engineering, mixing
 Hans "Hasse" Olsson – piano and synthesizer

Technical
 Kjell Andersson – sleeve design
 Calle Bengtsson – photography
 Björn Boström – engineering

Charts

Other versions
"Ännu doftar kärlek" has been covered by several other recording artists. Four different versions of the song were released in 1985 alone; it appeared as the opening track on Stefan Borsch's album Sjung din sång, and as the title track on Curt Haagers' record Ännu doftar kärlek. Haagers' version became a substantial airplay hit, peaking within the top five of the Svensktoppen chart. The song also appeared on Ingmar Nordströms' album Saxparty 12. Finnish vocalist Marisa released "Jos Yhä Sydän Tuntee" ("If You've Ever Known How It Feels to Have a Heart") – a translated version of "Ännu doftar kärlek" – as a double A-side with her original composition "Tanssi Kanssani" ("Dance with Me"). "Jos Yhä Sydän Tuntee" later appeared on Marisa's self-titled debut album, which was eventually released in 1987. Erik Linder, a semi-finalist in the 2009 series of Sweden's Got Talent, recorded versions of both "Ännu doftar kärlek" and Fredriksson's 1996 single "Tro" for his 2009 album Inifrån.

References

External links

1984 debut singles
1984 songs
Marie Fredriksson songs
Pop ballads
Swedish-language songs
Songs written by Marie Fredriksson
Curt Haagers songs
Stefan Borsch songs
Songs written by Lasse Lindbom